was a Japanese daimyō of the late Sengoku period to early Edo period who served as lord of the Hiroshima Domain. A retainer of Toyotomi Hideyoshi, he fought in the Battle of Shizugatake in 1583, and soon became known as one of Seven Spears of Shizugatake which also included Katō Kiyomasa and others.

Biography

Fukushima Ichimatsu, was born in 1561, in Futatsudera, Kaitō, Owari Province (present-day Ama, Aichi Prefecture), the eldest son of barrel merchant Fukushima Masanobu. However, it is also said that his father, Masanobu, was his father-in-law. In the latter case, his father is believed to have been cooper Hoshino Narimasa from Kiyosu, Kasugai, Owari Province (present-day Kiyosu, Aichi Prefecture). His mother was the younger sister of Toyotomi Hideyoshi's mother, making Hideyoshi his first cousin.

As a young man, he served as a page (koshō) of Hideyoshi through their mothers' relation.

He first engaged in battle at the assault on Miki Castle in 1578-1580 at Harima Province, and following the Battle of Yamazaki in 1582, he was granted a 500 koku stipend.

At the Battle of Shizugatake in 1583, he defeated Haigo Gozaemon, a prominent samurai.  Masanori (Tenshō 11) had the honor of taking the first head, namely that of the enemy general Ogasato Ieyoshi, receiving a 5000 koku increase in his stipend for this distinction (the other six "Spears" each received 3000 Koku), he married with Omasa.

Masanori took part in many of Hideyoshi's campaigns; it was after the Kyūshū Expedition in 1587, however, that he was made a daimyō. Receiving the fief of Imabari in Iyo Province, his income was rated at 110,000 koku. Soon after, he took part in the Korean Campaign. Masanori was to once again receive distinction when he took Ch'ongju in 1592.

Following his involvement in the Korean campaign, Masanori was involved in the pursuit of Toyotomi Hidetsugu. He led 10,000 men in 1595, surrounded Seiganji temple on Mount Kōya, and waited until Hidetsugu had committed suicide. With Hidetsugu dead, Masanori received a 90,000 koku increase in stipend, and received Hidetsugu's former fief of Kiyosu, in Owari Province as well.

In September, 1600, Masanori took part in the Battle of Gifu Castle against Oda Hidenobu of the Ishida Mitsunari western forces. The battle served as a prelude to the Battle of Sekigahara the following month.

Battle of Sekigahara

In 1600, Masanori sided with Tokugawa Ieyasu 'Eastern army' at the Battle of Sekigahara. He was the leader of the Tokugawa advance guard. He started the battle, and charged north from the Eastern Army's left flank along the Fuji River attacking the Western Army's right centre. Masanori troops fought against Ukita Hideie army, what is said to have been one of the bloodiest confrontations in the battle. Ukita's troops were winning the battle, pushing back Masanori's army. However, after Kobayakawa Hideaki changes side to support Eastern army and his action forced the other armies to had pledged a betrayal. Later, Masanori's army was winning the fight and the Eastern Army won the battle.

After Sekigahara, Masanori ensured the survival of his domain. Although he later lost his holdings, his descendants became hatamoto in the service of the Tokugawa shōgun.

Forfeit of titles
Shortly after the death of Ieyasu in 1619, Masanori was accused of breaching Buke Shohatto by repairing a small part of the Hiroshima Castle, which was damaged during the flood caused by a typhoon, without receiving permission. Although Masanori applied for permission two months before, he had not received it officially from the bakufu. It is said that he repaired only the leaky part of the building out of necessity. Although this case was settled down on the condition that Masanori, who was in attendance for his duty in Edo, would apologize and remove the repaired parts of the castle, the bakufu again accused him of insufficient removal of the repaired parts, and as a result, his territories in Aki and Bingo Provinces worth 500,000 koku were confiscated; instead he was given Takaino Domain, one of 4 counties in Kawanakajima, Shinano Province and Uonuma County, Echigo Province worth 45,000 koku.

Nihongo spear
 Nihongo or Nippongo (日本号): A famous spear that was once used in the Imperial Palace. This is one of The Three Great Spears of Japan.  Nihongo later found its way into the possession of Fukushima Masanori, and then Tahei Mori. It is now at The Fukuoka City Museum where it was restored.

In popular culture
Fukushima Masanori is featured in Koei's video games Kessen, Kessen III, Samurai Warriors, and as a non-playable character in Samurai Warriors 3.  He is a playable character in the third installment's expansions, Samurai Warriors 3 Z and Samurai Warriors 3: Xtreme Legends, and in the fourth installment, Samurai Warriors 4 and its subsequent expansions. He is a playable character in Pokémon Conquest (Pokémon + Nobunaga's Ambition in Japan), with his partner Pokémon being Krokorok and Krookodile.

He is mentioned in the movie Harakiri (1962). In the movie his retainer Tsugomo is the protagonist.

References

External links
 Biography of Fukushima Masanori 

1560s births
1624 deaths
16th-century Japanese people
17th-century Japanese people
Daimyo
People from Ama, Aichi
People from Aichi Prefecture
Samurai
Toyotomi retainers